Šolontu is a Manchu masculine given name meaning "Qiulong" or "small-horned dragon". Alternative spelling or transliterations, such as Solontu, Xolontu, and Sholontu, are also existed.

Citations

References

See also
Manchu given name

Given names
Manchu masculine given names